The following is a list of Cerambycidae of Nepal. Four-hundred and sixty eight species are listed.

This list is primarily based on Andreas Weigel's 2006 list and Maxim Lazarev's 2019 list with some recent additions and a modernized classification.

Subfamily Disteniinae
Dynamostes audax 
Cyrtonops punctipennis
Aegosoma ornaticolle

Subfamily Prioninae
Bandar pascoei
Anomophysis elliotti
Anomophysis inscripta
Anomophysis plagiata
Anomophysis spinosa
Cantharocnemis downesii
Rhaphipodus gahani
Megopis bowringi
Megopis buckleyi
Megopis (Spinimegopis) nepalensis
Megopis sulcipennis
Megopis (Spinimegopis) tibialis
Casiphia himalayaensis
Dorysthenes buqueti
Dorysthenes huegelii 
Dorysthenes indicus
Dorysthenes sternalis
Dorysthenes zivetta
Prionus corpulentus
Sarmydus antennatus
Sarmydus subcoriaceus
Necydalis nepalensis
Arhopalus tibetanus
Tetropium oreinum
Atimia juniperi
Caraphia granulifera
Formosotoxotus nobuoi
Pachyta perlata
Anastrangalia lavinia 
Anastrangalia rubriola
Gahanaspia miniacea
Idiostrangalia quadrisignata
Leptura lavinia
Nanostrangalia torui
Paranaspia frainii
Parastrangalis emotoi
Strangalia bilineaticollis
Palaeoxylosteus kucerai

Subfamily Cerambycinae
Comusia thailandica
Neomarius thomasi
Noserius indicus
Oemospila maculipennis
Oplatocera oberthuri
Plocaederus ruficornis
Tetraommatus fragilis
Xystrocera globosa
Aeolesthes indicola
Derolus volvulus 
Dialeges pauper
Diorthus pellitulus
Dymasius subvestitus
Hoplocerambyx spinicornis
Margites modicus
Massicus dierli
Neocerambyx paris
Pachydissus parvicollis
Rhytidodera bowringi
Rhytidodera consona
Rhytidodera simluans
Xoanodera regularis
Nortia fuscata
Stromatium barbatum 

Zoodes basalis
Nyphasia apicalis
Nyphasia fuscipennis
Nyphasia pascoei
Ceresium leucosticticum
Ceresium lucifugum
Ceresium propinquum

Stenodryas apicalis
Stenodryas nigromaculatus
Obrium aegrotum
Obrium posticum
Stenhomalus fenestratus
Stenhomalus versicolor
Prothema aurata 
Epania abdominalis
Epania mundali
Epania picipes
Glaphyra darjeelingensis
Glaphyra molorchoides
Glaphyra shimai
Berndgerdia balteata
Euchlanis argentifer
Euchlanis robustulus
Euchlanis testacea
Merionoeda indica
Merionoeda nigriceps
Merionoeda phoebe
Anubis inermis 
Aphrodisium cantori
Aphrodisium cribricolle
Aphrodisium hardwickianum
Pachyteria fasciata
Thranius simplex
Acrocyrtidus auricomus
Rosalia formosa
Rosalia hariola
Rosalia lateritia
Gerdberndia atricolor
Gerdberndia ferrocyaneus
Gerdberndia nubigena
Semanotus nigroalbus
Chlorophorus acrocarpi 
Chlorophorus annularis

Chlorophorus annularoides
Chlorophorus annulatus

Chlorophorus anulifer
Chlorophorus arciferus
Chlorophorus assimilis
Chlorophorus dureli
Chlorophorus furcillatus
Chlorophorus henriettae
Chlorophorus insidiosus
Chlorophorus nepalensis
Chlorophorus quaduordecimmaculatus
Chlorophorus reductus
Demonax albicinctus 
Demonax ascendens
Demonax balyi
Demonax bicinctus
Demonax buteae
Demonax cf. breveluteobasalis (possibly Demonax breveluteobasalis)
Demonax christinae
Demonax dorotheae
Demonax gertrudae
Demonax gunjii
Demonax himalayanus
Demonax ingridae
Demonax josefinae
Demonax katarinae
Demonax leucoscutellatus 
Demonax mariae
Demonax narayani
Demonax nigromaculatus
Demonax rosae
Demonax sabinae
Demonax semiluctuosus
Demonax testaceus
Demonax trudae
Hesperoclytus katarinae
Ischnodora separanda
Perissus fuliginosus
Perissus magdalenae
Perissus mutabilis
Perissus quercus
Rhaphuma afflata
Rhaphuma anopla
Rhaphuma aranea
Rhaphuma bhaktai
Rhaphuma brigittae
Rhaphuma chatterjeei
Rhaphuma fulgurata
Rhaphuma hermina
Rhaphuma horsfieldi
Rhaphuma ilsae
Rhaphuma joshi
Rhaphuma moerens
Rhaphuma nishidai
Rhaphuma praeusta
Rhaphuma quadrimaculata
Rhaphuma querciphaga
Rhaphuma sharmai
Rhaphuma weigeli
Xylotrechus arunensis
Xylotrechus basifuliginosuss

Xylotrechus buqueti
Xylotrechus contortus
Xylotrechus difformis
Xylotrechus gestroi
Xylotrechus incurvatus
Xylotrechus javanicus
Xylotrechus longithorax
Xylotrechus smei
Xylotrechus stebbingi
Xylotrechus subcarinatus
Xylotrechus subdepressus
Anaglyptus abieticola
Anaglyptus fasciatus
Anaglyptus marmoratus
Epipedocera affinis
Epipedocera chakhata
Epipedocera undulata
Epipedocera zona
Erythrus coccineus
Erythrus suturellus
Erythrus westwoodi
Pyrestes pyrrhus
Pyrestes rufipes nepalicus
Pyrocalymma pyrochroides
Artimpaza dehra
Artimpaza obscura 
Artimpaza punctigera 
Cleomenes apicalis
Cleomenes ornatus
Dere grahami 
Dere khatrii 
Dere opacula 
Diplothorax fasciatus 
Nida championi
Paramimistena gracilicornis
Euryphagus lundii 
Purpuricenus optabilis

Subfamily Lamiinae
Parathylactus dorsalis
Thylactus sikkimensis
Xylorhiza adusta
Aconodes euphorbiae
Aconodes latefasciatus
Aconodes montanus
Aconodes nepalensis
Dolophrades mustanganus
Morimopsis dalihodi
Trichodorcadion gardneri
Acalolepta aurata
Acalolepta battonii
Acalolepta breviscapa
Acalolepta cervina
Acalolepta elongata
Acalolepta freudei
Acalolepta haradai 
Acalolepta griseipennis
Acalolepta longicollis
Acalolepta nepalensis
Acalolepta semidegenera
Acalolepta sericans
Acalolepta sikkimensis rufoantennata
Acalolpeta affinis
Annamanum sikkimense
Aristobia horridula
Aristobia testudo
Blepephaeus nepalensis
Blepephaeus ocellatus
Blepephaeus succinctor
Celosterna scabrator
Combe brianus
Cremnosterna carissima
Epepeotes uncinatus
Macrochenus guerinii
Monochamus basifossulatus
Monochamus bimaculatus
Monochamus dubius
Paraleprodera insidiosa
Paraleprodera stephanus
Parepepeotes guttatus
Pharsalia subgemmata

Pseudonemophas versteegii
Xenicotela distincta
Apriona germari

Apriona parvigranula
Apriona sublaevis
Batocera horsfieldi
Batocera numitor
Batocera roylei
Batocera rubus
Batocera rufomaculata
Aesopida malasiaca
Agelasta bifasciana
Agelasta tonkinea
Anagelasta apicalis
Cacia cretifera
Coptops leucosticticus
Coptops lichenea
Falsomesosella bhutanensis
Falsomesosella gardneri
Falsomesosella rufovittata
Mesocacia duplicaria
Mesosa setulosa
Mesosa affinis nepalica
Mesosa gardneri
Imantocera penicillata
Imantocera vicina
Palimna palimnoides
Palimnodes ducalis
Olenecamptus anogeissi
Olencamptus bilobus indianus
Olenecamptus multinotatus
Olenecamptus cf. serratus (possibly Olenecamptus serratus)
Apomecyna cretacea
Apomecyna histrio
Apomecyna leucosticta
Apomecyna naevia
Apomecyna saltator
Atimura combreti
Eunidia kumatai
Eunidia lateralis
Hyagnis pakistanus
Neosybra ochreovittata
Ropica honesta
Ropica lineatithorax
Ropica rosti
Zorilispe harai
Aulaconotus grammopterus
Cleptometopus indistinctus
Cleptometopus mniszechi
Cleptometopus cf. olivaceus (possibly Cleptometopus olivaceus)
Cleptometopus parolivaceus
Eucomatocera vittata
Hippocephala argentistriata
Hyllisia lineata
Phelipara affins
Phelipara indica
Pothyne indica
Pothyne macrophthalma
Pothyne sikkimensis
Pothyne variegata
Pseudocalamobius burmanensis
Pseudocalamobius luteonotatus
Pseudocalamobius obscuriscapus
Pseudocalamobius rufescens
Pseudocalamobius truncatus
Tetraglenes hirticornis
Xenolea asiatica
Moechotypa asiatica
Diastocera wallichii
Ithocritus ruber
Calothyrza margaritifera
Desisa quadriplagiata
Desisa subfasciata
Egesina anterufipennis
Egesina basirufa
Egesina cleroides
Egesina flavopicta
Egesina generosa
Marmylaris buckleyi
Marmylaris truncatipennis
Niphona fuscatrix
Niphona obscura
Niphona parallela
Paramesosella stheniformis
Paranaches simplex
Pterolophia brahma
Pterolophia brevegibbosa
Pterolophia carinata
Pterolophia dorsalis
Pterolophia krishna
Pterolophia lunigera
Pterolophia nigrovirgulata
Pterolophia obscurata
Pterolophia oculata
PPterolophia pedongensis
Pterolophia persimilis
Pterolophia phungi
Pterolophia postfasciculata
Pterolophia quadrifasciata
Pterolophia quadratiplagiata
Pterolophia shiva
Pterolophia tibialis
Pterolophia transverseplagiata
Pterolophia zebrina
Sthenias longeantennatus
Sthenias pseudodorsalis
Diboma bhutanensis
Diboma sybroides
Eupogoniopsis sepicola
Falseunidia albosignata
Miccolamia relucens
Mimovitalisia wittmeri
Mimozotale cylindrica
Parasophronica cf. strandiella (possibly Parasophronica strandiella)
Pareuseboides albomarmorata
Pseudanaesthetis assamensis
Rhodopina albomaculata
Rhodopina albomarmorata
Rhodopina alboplagiata
Rhodopina manipurensis
Sophronica apicalis
Sophronica brunnea
Sophronica paupercula
Cristosydonia alterna
Cristenes sp.
Exocentrus alboguttatus
Exocentrus alboseriatus
Exocentrus alni
Exocentrus carissae
Exocentrus championi
Exocentrus cudraniae
Exocentrus dalbergiae
Exocentrus explanatidens
Exocentrus ficicola
Exocentrus flemingiae
Exocentrus grewiae
Exocentrus kleebergi
Exocentrus parcus
Exocentrus procerulus
Exocentrus pubescens
Exocentrus ravillus
Exocentrus specularis
Exocentrus tenellus
Exocentrus testaceus
Exocentrus transversifrons
Ostedes prope brunneovariegata
Paraclodia cf. besucheti (possibly Paraclodia besucheti)
Pararhopaloscelides sericeipennis jumlaensis
Pararondibilis acrosa
Pararondibilis eluta
Pareoporis nigrosignata
Pareryssamena fuscosignata
Rondibilis bastiana
Rondibilis bispinosa
Rondibilis pedongensis
Rondibilis plagiata
Rondibilis simillima
Rondibilis subundulata
Sciades elongatus
Trichemeopedus calosus
Trichemeopedus holzschuhi
Trichohoplorana mutica
Glenea astathiformis
Glenea cancellata
Glenea capriciosa
Glenea indiana
Glenea momeitensis
Glenea pulchra
Glenea quatuordecimmaculata
Glenea spilota

Glenea t-notata
Glenea vaga
Glenea virens bastiana
Linda rubescens
Linda semiatra
Linda testacea
Nupserha annulata
Nupserha annulata mustangensis
Nupserha basipilosa
Nupserha cauta
Nupserha dubia
Nupserha fricator
Nupserha fuscoapicalis
Nupserha lenita
Nupserha nigriceps
Nupserha pallidipennis
Nupserha pallidipennis flavipennis
Nupserha quadrioculata
Nupserha rotundicollis
Nupserha schmidi
Nupserha schmidi arunensis
Nupserha schmidi tambaensis
Oberea atropunctata
Oberea bootangensis
Oberea consentanea
Oberea ferruginea
Oberea himalayana
Oberea montivagans medioplagiata
Oberea nigriventris
Oberea posticata
Oberea pseudoposticata
Obereopsis annulicorni
Obereopsis atrosternalis
Obereopsis infranigra
Obereopsis limbata
Obereopsis longipes
Obereopsis luteicornis
Obereopsis modica
Obereopsis nepalensis
Obereopsis obscura nigroabdominalis
Obereopsis sericeoides
Obereopsis sikkimensis
Obereopsis trinotaticollis
Phytoecia cf. kashmirica (possibly Phytoecia kashmirica)
Serixia sp.
Stibara tetraspilota
Astathes violaceipennis
Bacchisa frontalis
Lasiophrys latifrons
Momisis monticola
Plaxomicrus ellipticus
Plaxomicrus latus
Nyctimenius tristis

See also
List of butterflies of Nepal
Odonata of Nepal
Zygaenidae of Nepal
Wildlife of Nepal

References

 01
Cerambycidae
Insects of Nepal
Nepal, Cerambycidae